Kailua-Kona is an unincorporated community and census-designated place (CDP) in Hawaii County, Hawaii, United States. It is also known as Kailua (a name it shares with a community located on the windward side of Oahu), as Kona (a name it shares with the district to which it belongs) and as Kona Town. Kailua-Kona is the second-largest settlement on the island of Hawaii (after Hilo) and the largest settlement on the west side of the island, where it is the center of commerce and the tourist industry. Kailua-Kona is served by Kona International Airport, located just to the north in the adjacent CDP of Kalaoa. The population was 19,713 at the 2020 census, up from 11,975 at the 2010 census.

Kailua-Kona was the closest major settlement to the epicenter of the 2006 Kiholo Bay earthquake.

Kailua-Kona's boundaries were altered significantly for the 2020 census. The eastern portion of Kailua-Kona became part of the neighboring Holualoa CDP, while the western portion of Holualoa became part of Kailua-Kona.

History 

The community was established by King Kamehameha I to be his seat of government when he was chief of Kona before he consolidated rule of the archipelago in 1795. It was later designated as the capital of the newly unified Kingdom of Hawaii. The capital was later moved to Lāhainā, and then to Honolulu.

Royal fishponds at Kaloko-Honokōhau National Historical Park were the hub of unified Hawaiian culture. The town later functioned as a retreat of the Hawaiian royal family. Up until the late 1900s, Kailua-Kona was primarily a small fishing village. In the late 20th and early 21st centuries, the region has undergone a real estate and construction boom fueled by tourism and investment.

Geography 
Kailua-Kona is located at  (19.649973, −155.994028), along the shoreline of Kailua Bay and up the southern slope of Hualālai volcano. There are no major rivers or streams in Kailua-Kona or on the Kona side of Hawaii.

Kailua-Kona is bordered to the north by Kalaoa, to the south by Holualoa, and to the west by the Pacific Ocean from Kailua Bay in the south to Honokohau Bay in the north. The Kailua-Kona postal code is 96740 (post office boxes – 96745).

Climate 
Kailua-Kona has a tropical, semi-arid climate (Köppen BSh) with warm temperatures year-round, typical of its latitude in the tropics. It is the warmest place in the United States of America in January on average. Humidity is generally between 50% and 70%. Mornings are typically clear, while thermal clouds created in the day raise the temperature during the day.

Vog can cover parts of the Kona coast from time to time depending on the activity of the Kilauea volcano and the island winds. Kailua-Kona is located on the leeward side of the Hualalai Volcano, sheltering the town from wind and rain.

Demographics

2000 Census data

As of the census of 2000, there were 9,870 people, 3,537 households, and 2,429 families residing in Kailua-Kona. The racial makeup of the City was 38.7% White, 0.5% Black or African American, 0.5% Native American, 18.3% Asian, 13.2% Pacific Islander, 1.9% from other races, and 27.07% from two or more races. 10.2% of the population were Hispanic or Latino of any race.

There were 3,537 households, out of which 35.0% had children under the age of 18 living with them, 49.6% were married couples living together, 13.6% had a female householder with no husband present, and 31.3% were non-families. 22.6% of all households were made up of individuals, and 7.2% had someone living alone who was 65 years of age or older. The average household size was 2.78 and the average family size was 3.26.

In Kailua-Kona the population was spread out, with 27.3% under the age of 18, 9.0% from 18 to 24, 28.8% from 25 to 44, 24.9% from 45 to 64, and 10.0% who were 65 years of age or older. The median age was 36 years. For every 100 females, there were 98.8 males. For every 100 females age 18 and over, there were 95.8 males.

The median income for a household in the city was $40,874, and the median income for a family was $46,657. Males had a median income of $30,353 versus $26,471 for females. The per capita income for the CDP was $20,624. 10.8% of the population and 6.5% of families were below the poverty line. Out of the total population, 11.9% of those under the age of 18 and 3.9% of those 65 and older were living below the poverty line.

Economy

Kailua-Kona saw an economic downturn during the 2008 national financial crisis but in the early 2010s has seen significant growth and economic development. Tourism also saw a downturn in the late 2000s but has since seen some resurgence. Visitor air arrivals alone increased about 160% from 2010 to 2017.

The University of Hawaii held its first classes at the new Hawaii Community College Palamanui Campus in 2015.

Since the early 2000s the Kona side had seen significant amounts of vog from Puʻu ʻŌʻō and Kīlauea, but that changed in May 2018 when Kilauea largely ceased its emissions. The air in Kailua-Kona is clearer than it has been in decades.

Attractions and events 
Kailua-Kona is the host of the annual Ironman World Championship triathlon, the annual Kona Coffee Festival, and the Hawaiian International Billfish Tournament.

Kona coffee is the variety of Coffea arabica cultivated on the slopes of Hualālai and Mauna Loa in the North and South Kona Districts. The Kona Historical Society manages two coffee related historical sites: the Kona Coffee Living History Farm and the H.N. Greenwell Store Museum just south of Kailua-Kona.

Ali'i Drive, Kailua's oceanfront downtown street, starts at Kailua-Kona Pier. It has also been given the designation as a Hawaii Scenic Byway called the "Royal Footsteps Along the Kona Coast". This byway features archaeological sites that have survived for hundreds of years.

North of the pier is the Kamakahonu royal residence and Ahuena Heiau, and nearby now stands the King Kamehameha's Kona Beach Hotel. Another royal residence is Hulihee Palace, used by members of the Hawaiian royal family until 1914. The Historic Kona Inn and other shops are on the street.

Churches on the drive include Mokuaikaua Church, Hawaii's first Christian church built in 1820, Saint Michael the Archangel Catholic Church, and Living Stones Church, a historical structure built after Mokuaikaua and used as a Christian Missionary landing location in the 1800-1900. Parks include La'aloa Bay (also known as Magic Sands or White Sands Beach) and Kahaluu Bay, which is a popular snorkeling location.

Boat tours which allow tourists to swim with dolphins, watch whales, and fish in the ocean usually depart from Honokohau Harbor.

Media 
Kailua-Kona is served by television station KLEI and by the newspaper West Hawaii Today, which is owned by Canadian publisher Black Press Media (Black Press Group Ltd.)—also known simply as Black Press—whose headquarters are in Surrey, British Columbia, Canada.

Education 
The Hawaii Department of Education operates public schools. Kealakehe Elementary School, Kahakai Elementary School, Kealakehe Intermediate School, and Kealakehe High School are in the Kailua CDP.

The University of the Nations, a Youth With A Mission training center, is located in Kailua-Kona.

Notable residents 
Bret Bollinger, singer and bass guitarist in the band Pepper
B.K. Cannon, actress
Michael Dell, founder and CEO of Dell Technologies
Sandra Kurtzig, technology entrepreneur
Arthur V. Loughren, pioneer in the development of NTSC television
John Paul Thomas, artist
Brian Keith Adams, wrestler

References

External links 

 Konaweb, community web site
 Kona Historical Society
 Hawaii Scenic Byways
 Kona-Kohala Chamber of Commerce
 North Kona shoreline access map at Hawaii County web site
 Photosphere of Kailua-Kona by Gerald Besson

Kailua-Kona
Census-designated places in Hawaii County, Hawaii
Capitals of former nations
Populated places on Hawaii (island)
Triathlon venues
Populated coastal places in Hawaii